= Eye on Attraction =

American rock band

Eye on Attraction is an independent progressive and alternative rock band from Scranton, Pennsylvania established in 2010.

The band members are Jen Fracas (vocals), Andrew Merkle (drums), Joe Terry (bass), and Mike Trischetta (guitar).

Eye on Attraction won the 2018 Steamtown Music Artist of the Year Award. The drummer of the band, Andrew Merkle, also won both the 2018 and 2015 Steamtown Music Drummer of the Year Award. They were also nominated for the 2015 Steamtown Music Album of the Year and Rock/Alternative Rock Act of the Year Awards.

The band also raised $11,599 through an Indiegogo crowdfunding campaign to fund their current two-part album, "The Method" and "The Madness".

== Discography ==
- The Factory
- Staircases
- Magic is Might
- The Method

They are currently working on their next release titled "The Madness".
